Bu Laʻia (born as Shawn Kaui Hill in Waimanalo, Hawaii) is a Hawaiian comedian known for his use of Hawaiian pidgin and for wearing a large "afro style" wig and blacking out one of his front teeth while performing.  He starred in a cable television show in the early 1990s and released two comic musical albums entitled False Crack??? And Hawaii's Most Wanted. He also attained fame—or notoriety—when he ran for governor of Hawaiʻi in 1994 (when he was too young to legally do so) and again as a member of the Natural Law Party in 2002. He also attracted attention when he was arrested for riding a skateboard at Honolulu International Airport. Bu is pidgin for "Bull".  The name "Bu Laʻia" is a homophone of "Bull Liar", a phrase meaning "an outrageous liar".  His name is reminiscent of the character created by Hawaiian comedian Kent Bowman, “K.K. Kaumanua” (K.K. Cow–Manure) famous for his "Pidgin English Children's Stories," although Bowman's character uses the pidgin English of an earlier generation.

External links
False Crack??? at Amazon
Hawaii's Most Wanted at Amazon
Da Bestest of Bu at Amazon
Hawaiʻi News Now Bu Laʻia: The Legend Continues
USA Today 2002 Governors' race results

Living people
American male comedians
21st-century American comedians
Year of birth missing (living people)